Semen Padang FC U-20 is an Indonesian football team located in Indarung, Padang, Indonesia. They are the reserve team from Semen Padang. Their nickname are Kabau Sirah Mudo.

History 
They became the runner-up in the 2011 Indonesia Super League U-21. On 19 October 2014, Semen Padang U-21 won the 2014 Indonesia Super League U-21 after defeating Sriwijaya U-21 4–0 in the final.

Honours 

Indonesia Super League U-21 
 Champion: 2014
 Runner-up: 2011

2019 squad 
The following players are eligible for Liga 1 U-20 in the current 2019 Liga 1 U-20 season.

References

External links 
 

Semen Padang F.C.
Association football clubs established in 2010